Jérôme Gallion (born 4 April 1955, in Toulon) is a retired French international rugby union  scrum half for RC Toulonnais. He is now a dental surgeon.

Gallion made his international début for France in January 1978, against England, replacing the retired Jacques Fouroux.

Honours 
 French rugby champion, 1987.
 Challenge Yves du Manoir finalist 1987
 French championship finalist 1985 and 1989

References

External links
 ESPN profile

1955 births
Living people
French rugby union players
French dentists
Rugby union scrum-halves
France international rugby union players